Krzemień is a mountain in the Bieszczady Mountains of southern Poland. It has an elevation of 1,335 meters.

Mountains of Poland